The Garázda is an old Hungarian aristocratic family.  The family has two major branches the House of Szilágyi and the House of Teleki. Lóránd Szilágyi de Garázda  is the ancestor of the House of Szilágyi.

See also
House of Szilágyi
House of Teleki

References
Fejérpataky László és Áldásy Antal: Magyar címeres emlékek; Magyar Heraldikai és Genealogiai Társaság (1901, 1902, 1926)

Szilágyi family